The 120 members of the fourth Knesset were elected on 3 November 1959. The breakdown by party was as follows:
Mapai: 47
Herut: 17
National Religious Party: 12
Mapam: 9
General Zionists: 8
Ahdut HaAvoda: 7
Religious Torah Front: 6
Progressive Party: 6
Maki: 3
Progress and Development: 2
Cooperation and Brotherhood: 2
Agriculture and Development: 1

List of members

Replacements

External links
Members of the Fourth Knesset Knesset website

 
04